Vinasat-1 (stylized in all uppercase) is the first Vietnamese satellite to be placed in orbit. It was launched at 22:17 GMT on 18 April 2008, by an Ariane 5ECA rocket from the Guiana Space Centre in Kourou. The launch was conducted by the European organisation Arianespace. VINASAT is the national satellite program of Vietnam. The project aims to bring independence in satellite communications for Vietnam, besides other benefits such as enhancing national security, opening new economic opportunities, etc.

Vietnam hopes for some economic benefits from the telecommunications links that the satellite will provide. It is expected that the satellite will save several million dollars per year in fees presently paid for leasing of transponders on satellites from other countries. Vietnam hopes for radio, television, and telephone access in all corners of the country.

Originally planned for 2005, the launch of Vinasat-1 was delayed to 18 April 2008, owing to difficulties in completing the frequency coordination procedures under the Radio Regulations of the International Telecommunication Union (ITU).

The project of providing the operations for the satellite was entirely managed by Lockheed Martin Commercial Space Systems (LMCSS). This was due to a delivery-in-orbit contract signed in Hanoi on May 12, 2006.

The Lockheed Martin A2100 satellite has 12 Ku band transponders and 8 C band transponders.

See also
Vinasat-2

References

External links
 VINASAT:Thanh Nien News Vietnam's first satellite launch delayed until 2008
 
 Vinasat 1 Satellite Vinasat 1 Launch Video.

Communications satellites in geostationary orbit
Telecommunications in Vietnam
2008 in Vietnam
Spacecraft launched in 2008
First artificial satellites of a country
Satellites of Vietnam
Satellites using the A2100 bus